Wiam Maher Najib Wahhab (born on 11 October 1964) is a Lebanese
Druze politician and journalist from Jahlieh, Chouf District, and the founder of the Arab Unification Party.

Biography
He ran for parliamentary elections in 1996 and won 12,000 votes but lost the elections. 

He heads the Arab Unification Party that he founded on 26 May 2006, and whose principles are based on cross-border: secularism, sects, doctrines and narrow fanaticism, and his rejection of all forms of injustice, exploitation, feudalism, deprivation and sanctification of public freedoms and human rights.

Wahhab was the target of assassination attempts in the Hasbaya District in 2006 and in the town of Kfar Him, Chouf District in 2008 for rejecting the feudal reality in the Druze community.

Wahhab was in the 2018 parliamentary elections against the March 8 and March 14 alliances, and the slogan of his battle was the war on corruption, and the list that led by a number of independent candidates for March 8 and 14. He received 13,000 votes and defeated candidate Marwan Hamadeh by preferential votes, with 7,391 votes against 7,266 yet still lost the elections since his list failed to reach the required electoral quotient.

In the 2022 parliamentary elections Wahhab formed an electoral alliance with FPM and Talal Arslan yet lost the elections once again.

Controversy
During a television interview, Wahhab made disparaging comments about the Niqab which Saudi women wear. Sunni Muslim groups protested. Wahhab apologized to Saudi women for the niqab remarks.

Wahhab commented on Turkey's warnings to Syria during the 2011 uprising by claiming that Syria and Bashar al-Assad were prepared to launch 100,000 rockets at Turkey if it tried to invade.

The US has placed financial sanctions on Wahhab.

Personal life
Wahhab's daughter, Rida, is a Lebanon international footballer.

References

External links

نشأة حزب التوحيد العربي
مبادئ الحزب
Lebanon: Shouf-Aley District to Turn into Electoral Battleground

1964 births
Living people
People from Chouf District
Lebanese Arab nationalists
Lebanese Druze
Political party founders
Specially Designated Nationals and Blocked Persons List